Journal Square–33rd Street is a rapid transit service operated by the Port Authority Trans-Hudson (PATH). It is colored yellow on the PATH service map and trains on this service display yellow marker lights. This service operates from Journal Square in Jersey City, New Jersey by way of the Uptown Hudson Tubes to 33rd Street in Midtown Manhattan, New York. The  trip takes 22 minutes to complete.

Operation
This service operates as a direct service from 6 a.m. to 11 p.m. on weekdays.  At other times, this service is replaced with the Journal Square-33rd Street (via Hoboken) service.

History
The Journal Square–33rd Street service originated as the Grove Street–33rd Street service operated by the Hudson and Manhattan Railroad (H&M).  It started operating between Grove Street in Jersey City, New Jersey and 33rd Street in Manhattan, beginning September 6, 1910. The Newark–Hudson Terminal line between Hudson Terminal and Grove Street also started operating at this time. The Newark line was extended to Manhattan Transfer on October 1, 1911, then subsequently expanded again. A stop at Summit Avenue (now Journal Square), located between Grove Street and Manhattan Transfer, opened on April 14, 1912, as an infill station on the Newark–Hudson Terminal line. The Summit Avenue station was completed on February 23, 1913, allowing service from 33rd Street to terminate there.

The 28th Street station was closed in September 1939 during the construction of the IND Sixth Avenue Line in Manhattan, and the 19th Street station was closed on August 1, 1954. The H&M itself was succeeded by Port Authority Trans-Hudson (PATH) in 1962.

After the September 11 attacks destroyed the World Trade Center station, service on the Journal Square–33rd Street line was suspended during overnight hours, with all service provided by the Newark–33rd Street via Hoboken branch. When the Exchange Place station reopened in June 2003, the Newark–33rd Street via Hoboken branch was truncated to Journal Square, but operated during weekends as well. It was renamed the Journal Square–33rd Street (via Hoboken) branch.

After Hurricane Sandy flooded the PATH system in October 2012, service on the line was suspended. For most of November, trains ran between Newark Penn Station and 33rd Street. The Journal Square–33rd Street line was temporarily extended to cover service on the Newark–World Trade Center line, which was suspended. Regular service on the line between Journal Square and 33rd Street was resumed on November 26, 2012, but full service would not be restored until early 2013. During the first few weeks of service after the hurricane, the stations at Christopher Street and 9th Street were closed due to overcrowding concerns.

Station listing

References

PATH (rail system) services